Chris Reher (born 7 April 1994) is a German footballer who plays as a forward for BFC Dynamo.

Career
Reher made his professional debut for Hallescher FC in the 3. Liga on 12 April 2014, coming on as a substitute in the 83rd minute for Francky Sembolo in the 0–3 away loss against 1. FC Saarbrücken.

References

External links
 Profile at DFB.de
 
 Hallescher FC II statistics at Fussball.de
 Budissa Bautzen statistics at Fussball.de

1994 births
Living people
Footballers from Dresden
German footballers
Association football forwards
Hallescher FC players
Berliner FC Dynamo players
3. Liga players
Regionalliga players
FSV Budissa Bautzen players
FC Viktoria 1889 Berlin players